The Lousios, also known in antiquity as Gortynius or Gortynios, is a river and a gorge in western Arcadia that stretches from Karytaina north to Dimitsana in Greece. The river begins near Lykochori  and flows through the Lousios Gorge. The river is treacherous and flows rapidly.

The river forms a deep, narrow gorge. The gorge is very popular amongst hikers. At the northern end of the gorge lies the town of Dimitsana. At the southern end is the ancient city of Gortys with the temple of Asclepius. Much of the gorge is heavily forested, and there are steep cliffs.

According to tradition, the river took its name from Zeus, the father of the Olympian gods, who according to Pausanias washed at its sources after his birth. Pausanias also considered Lousios the coldest river in the known world. The Lousios gorge is also known as the "Mount Athos of the Peloponnese" on account of the many monasteries that dot its walls: the Timiou Prodromou, Philosophou, Aimyalon, Panagias Kalamiou monasteries, and the Church of St. Andrew in Gortys. The gorge also features several old water-mills for tabac and gunpowder production.

Nearest places

Lykochori
Dimitsana, east of the river
Stemnitsa, east of the river
Gortyna, west of the river
Atsicholos, west of the river
Elliniko, east of the river

Gallery

References

External links

Landforms of Arcadia, Peloponnese
Rivers of Greece
Rivers of Peloponnese (region)
Canyons and gorges of Greece
Locations in Greek mythology